Kym Koster (born 1 February 1973) is a former Australian rules footballer who played 133 games in the Australian Football League, kicking 44 goals.

Recruited from South Australian National Football League side South Adelaide, Koster made his AFL debut for Footscray in 1994, playing 38 games and kicking 13 goals.  He transferred to Adelaide in 1996 where he played a further 95 games and kicked 31 goals until 2000.  Koster was a member of the 1997 and 1998 Adelaide Premiership teams.

Playing statistics

|-
|- style="background-color: #EAEAEA"
! scope="row" style="text-align:center" | 1994
|style="text-align:center;"|
| 12 || 23 || 10 || 6 || 156 || 110 || 266 || 53 || 42 || 0.4 || 0.3 || 6.8 || 4.8 || 11.6 || 2.3 || 1.8
|-
! scope="row" style="text-align:center" | 1995
|style="text-align:center;"|
| 12 || 15 || 3 || 4 || 121 || 87 || 208 || 32 || 26 || 0.2 || 0.3 || 8.1 || 5.8 || 13.9 || 2.1 || 1.7
|- style="background-color: #EAEAEA"
! scope="row" style="text-align:center" | 1996
|style="text-align:center;"|
| 9 || 9 || 4 || 6 || 92 || 62 || 154 || 39 || 18 || 0.4 || 0.7 || 10.2 || 6.9 || 17.1 || 4.3 || 2.0
|-
! scope="row" style="text-align:center;" | 1997
|style="text-align:center;"|
| 5 || 24 || 12 || 8 || 240 || 110 || 350 || 81 || 51 || 0.5 || 0.3 || 10.0 || 4.6 || 14.6 || 3.4 || 2.1
|- style="background-color: #EAEAEA"
! scope="row" style="text-align:center;" | 1998
|style="text-align:center;"|
| 5 || 26 || 7 || 11 || 255 || 158 || 413 || 63 || 54 || 0.3 || 0.4 || 9.8 || 6.1 || 15.9 || 2.4 || 2.1
|-
! scope="row" style="text-align:center" | 1999
|style="text-align:center;"|
| 5 || 20 || 6 || 6 || 177 || 115 || 292 || 43 || 44 || 0.3 || 0.3 || 8.9 || 5.8 || 14.6 || 2.2 || 2.2
|- style="background-color: #EAEAEA"
! scope="row" style="text-align:center" | 2000
|style="text-align:center;"|
| 5 || 16 || 2 || 3 || 95 || 93 || 188 || 25 || 18 || 0.1 || 0.2 || 5.9 || 5.8 || 11.8 || 1.6 || 1.1
|- class="sortbottom"
! colspan=3| Career
! 133
! 44
! 44
! 1136
! 735
! 1871
! 336
! 253
! 0.3
! 0.3
! 8.5
! 5.5
! 14.1
! 2.5
! 1.9
|}

References 

Adelaide Football Club players
Adelaide Football Club Premiership players
Western Bulldogs players
South Adelaide Football Club players
Australian rules footballers from South Australia
1973 births
Living people
Glenelg Football Club players
Two-time VFL/AFL Premiership players